Hilda Gertrude Cowham (1873–1964) was an English illustrator, famous for her work on children's books and ceramic nurseryware.

Biography
Hilda Cowham was born in 1873. She was a student at Wimbledon School of Art, Lambeth School of Art, and the Royal College of Art. She was one of the first women illustrators to publish in Punch. Her work was also published in The Sketch, The Graphic and other magazines and periodicals. She illustrated children's books, such as Fiddlesticks (1900), Peter Pickle and his dog Fido (1906), Curly Heads and Long Legs (1914), and Blacklegs and Others (1911). One of her characters, a "bush haired, black stockinged imp with big sash bow and infinitesimal petticoats", became famous as the "Cowham child" and was widely imitated. In the 1930s Cowham designed a number of posters for London Underground.

In the period 1924 to 1935, she and her friend Mabel Lucie Attwell were employed by Shelley Potteries Ltd to provide illustrations for baby's plate and nurseryware.

Cowham was married to Edgar Lander, also an artist; they had one son.

References

1873 births
1964 deaths
19th-century British women artists
20th-century British women artists
Place of birth missing
Alumni of the Royal College of Art
Alumni of the University of the Arts London
British illustrators